Differential nonlinearity (acronym DNL) is a commonly used measure of performance in digital-to-analog (DAC) and analog-to-digital (ADC) converters. It is a term describing the deviation between two analog values corresponding to adjacent input digital values. It is an important specification for measuring error in a digital-to-analog converter (DAC); the accuracy of a DAC is mainly determined by this specification. Ideally, any two adjacent digital codes correspond to output analog voltages that are exactly one Least Significant Bit (LSB) apart. Differential non-linearity is a measure of the worst-case deviation from the ideal 1 LSB step. For example, a DAC with a 1.5 LSB output change for a 1 LSB digital code change exhibits 1⁄2 LSB differential non-linearity. Differential non-linearity may be expressed in fractional bits or as a percentage of full scale. A differential non-linearity greater than 1 LSB may lead to a non-monotonic transfer function in a DAC. It is also known as a missing code.

Differential linearity refers to a constant relation between the change in the output and input.  For transducers if a change in the input produces a uniform step change in the output the transducer possess differential linearity.  Differential linearity is desirable and is inherent to a system such as a single-slope analog-to-digital converter used in nuclear instrumentation.

Formula

Effects of DNL
If the DNL of an ADC is smaller than -1, missing codes appear in the transfer function, i.e. there are codes for which there is no input voltage to get the code at the ADC output.
If the DNL of a DAC is bigger than 1, the transfer function of the DAC becomes non-monotonic. A non-monotonic DAC is especially not desired in closed-loop control application as it may cause stability problems, i.e. it may cause oscillations.

See also
Integral nonlinearity

References

External links
 INL/DNL Measurements for High-Speed Analog-to-Digital Converters (ADCs)  Application Note 283 by Maxim
 Understanding Data Converters

Digital signal processing